CT Serpentis (also known as Nova Serpentis 1948) was a nova that appeared in the constellation Serpens in 1948. It was discovered by Ramze Alexander Bartaya at Abastumani Observatory on 9 April 1946. It is thought to have reached magnitude 6.0, but this is an extrapolation of its light curve as it was not observed until 9 April 1948 when it was at magnitude 9.0 and fading—clearly past its maximum.

References

Novae
Serpens (constellation)
1948 in science
Serpentis, CT